Heinrich Ferdinand Scherk (27 October 1798 – 4 October 1885) was a German mathematician notable for his work on minimal surfaces and the distribution of prime numbers. He is also notable as the doctoral advisor of Ernst Kummer.

External links
 Biography of Scherk
 
MacTutor biography of Scherk

1798 births
1885 deaths
Academic staff of the Martin Luther University of Halle-Wittenberg
19th-century German mathematicians
Scientists from Poznań
Scientists from Bremen
Academic staff of the University of Kiel